Karthik Muralidharan (born November 1975) is an Indian economist who currently serves as a professor of economics at the University of California, San Diego, where he also holds the Tata Chancellor's Endowed Chair in Economics. His primary research interests include development economics, public economics, and labour economics. Moreover, Muralidharan is co-chair of the education programme of the Abdul Latif Jameel Poverty Action Lab (J-PAL). He also founded CEGIS, an organization aimed to improve lives by helping state governments deliver better development outcomes.

Biography 

After growing up in India, Karthik Muralidharan earned an A.B. in economics (summa cum laude) from Harvard University in 1998, followed by an M.Phil. in economics from Cambridge University in 1999, and a Ph.D. in economics again from Harvard University in 2007. Since his graduation, Muralidharan has mostly worked at the University of California, San Diego, first as an assistant professor (2008–14), and then as associate professor; since 2017, he has held the Tata Chancellor's Endowed Chair in Economics.

In line with his research activities, Muralidharan is affiliated with a number of economic research institutions, including J-PAL (where he is the co-chair of its education programme, together with Philip Oreopoulos), Innovations for Poverty Action, NBER, BREAD, the Center for Effective Global Action, the ifo Institute for Economic Research, and the International Growth Centre. In terms of professional service, he holds editorships with the Journal of Development Economics, the American Economic Journal: Applied Economics, and India Policy Forum, in addition to refereeing for various academic journals in economics.

Research

Karthik Muralidharan's research focuses on education, health and social protection, the measurement of the quality of public service delivery, programme evaluation, and improvements to the effectiveness of public spending (especially in developing countries). In particular, Muralidharan has contributed to the research of public servant absenteeism in developing countries, with a focus on teachers and health workers, e.g. finding that on average ca. 19% of teachers and 35% of health workers were absent on a given work day in a sample of developing countries (Bangladesh, Ecuador, India, Indonesia, Peru and Uganda), and that among those present many weren't working. Focusing on teacher absenteeism in India, further findings include that higher pay isn't generally correlated with higher presence, presence decreases in age and rank, and that absenteeism cannot be explained by teachers being outsiders to the communities in which they are teaching (as comparable local teachers have similar absence rates); moreover, private school teachers are only slightly less likely to be absent than public school teachers unless there is local competition between private and public schools. In another study on education, Muralidharan (together with Venkatesh Sundararaman) found that conditioning teacher pay on their performance for two years was effective in increasing students' performance in math and language tests by 0.27 and 0.17 standard deviations, respectively, in schools in Andhra Pradesh.

He is ranked among the top 6% of economists on IDEAS/RePEc.

References

External links

 Webpage of Karthik Muralidharan on the website of the University of California, San Diego

Indian development economists
University of California, San Diego faculty
Harvard University alumni
Alumni of the University of Cambridge
Labor economists
Education economists
1975 births
Living people